Steeven Petitteville is a French cinematographer.

He worked with directors Phil Joanou, Maurice Barthelemy, Vernie Yeung  or Franck Khalfoun among others and has accompanied various artists, writers and choreographers such as Youssef Nabil, Bret Easton Ellis, Benjamin Millepied, William Forsythe, John McIlduff and Brian Irvine on their directorial debuts and later work.

Steeven is a member of the French Society of Cinematographers

Filmography 
 Feature films

Terror on the Prairie directed by Michael Polish (US)
Operator directed by Logan Kibens (US) visions selection at SXSW festival 2016 South by Southwest 
The Veil directed by Phil Joanou (US)
Good Take (the Solitudes segment) directed by Vernie Yeung (HK)
Stroller Strategy directed by Clément Michel (Fr)Behold the Lamb directed by John Mcilduff (UK)
 Low Cost directed by Maurice Barthélemy (Fr)
Babies directed by Thomas Balmès (Fr) (doc)
 TVOn the Verge directed by Julie Delpy (US) NetflixThe deleted directed by Bret Easton Ellis (US)Crime d'État directed by Pierre Aknine (Fr)

 Art piecesChaconne by Benjamin Millepied (Dance)Alignigung by William ForsytheI saved my belly dancer by Youssef NabilMotion Sickness by Jessica Kenedy & John McIlduff (Dance)The Mysterious art of dancing'' by John McIlduff

Awards

US international film and video festival 2016:
 Gold camera Best cinematography / BMCE "let's dream of a new world" - Steeven Petitteville:

Film moves Belfast Film Festival 2013 short film Awards: 
 Best cinematography / Motion sickness - Steeven Petitteville / For over coming the problems of interpreting "the stage" with shots that challenged the audience at nearly every angles
 Best art in film / Motion sickness / Engrossing Choreography and performance realised through challenging photography

References

External links 
 
 
 steevenp.com

French cinematographers
Living people
Year of birth missing (living people)